Divin Saku Mubama (born 25 October 2004) is an English professional footballer who plays as a forward for Premier League club West Ham United.

Club career
Born in Newham, Mubama joined West Ham United at the age of eight. On 28 October 2021, Mubama signed his first professional contract with the club. On 3 November 2022, Mubama made his debut for West Ham in a UEFA Europa Conference League tie against Romanian club FCSB. West Ham won the game 3–0 with Mubama’s header diverted into his own goal by FCSB’s Joyskim Dawa for West Ham’s second goal.

On 16 March 2023, he scored his first senior competitive goal in the UEFA Europa Conference League in a 4-0 win against AEK Larnaca, after coming on as a substitute.

International career
Mubama has represented England at under-15, under-16, under-18, under-19 level.

Personal life
Mubama attended St Bonaventure's in Forest Gate.

Career statistics

References

2004 births
Living people
Footballers from the London Borough of Newham
English footballers
England youth international footballers
Association football forwards
West Ham United F.C. players
Black British sportsmen
Premier League players